Gordon Connell may refer to:

 Gordon Connell (actor) (1923–2016), American musical theatre and television actor
 Gordon Connell (rugby union) (born 1944), former Scotland international rugby union player